Dinan station (French: Gare de Dinan) is a French railway station on the Lison to Lamballe line, in the town of Dinan, Côtes-d'Armor, Brittany.
It has included a railway museum since 1991. The station was opened in 1879 by the Western Railways Company. 
It is now a station of the Société nationale des chemins de fer français (SNCF), served by trains operated by TER Bretagne.

Network location 

It is at kilometer point (KP) 169.940 of the Lison to Lamballe line, between the Hisse and Corseul stations.
It was at the start of lines to Saint-Énogat and La Brohinière, both of which were closed in the 1990s.

History

The single-track section from Dol-de-Bretagne to Lamballe, on which is Dinan is located, was commissioned on 29 December 1879 by the Western Railway Company.
The present station dates from 1931, and was designed by Georges-Robert Lefort.
It was part of the construction program launched by Raoul Dautry, general manager of the state railway administration, to renovate several of the company's stations.
Inside the hall there are two mosaics. One is a map of the railways in the region, and the other a map of the town of Dinan.
These mosaics have been registered as historical monuments since 21 November 1995.

Services

The station has a building with open ticket windows every day except Sunday and is also equipped with ticket vending machines.

Dinan is served by TER Bretagne trains that terminate or originate in the station.
Trains come from or go to Dol-de-Bretagne on one side (TER line 17), or Saint-Brieuc on the other side (TER line 24).
Some of the trains go on to, or come from, Lannion or Guingamp. 
There is only one round trip per day that does not end in this station, between Dol-de-Bretagne and Saint-Brieuc.
The station was served by a direct express train from Paris until 27 September 1986.

Connections
There is a parking lot.

The station is served by three road networks:
Lines 1 and 2 of the Dinan urban bus (Dinanbus)
Coaches of the Tibus departmental network on the following lines:
No 10 between Saint-Malo and Dinan 
No 11 between Dinan and Taden
No 17 between Dinan and Montauban-de-Bretagne
Coaches of the ILLENOO departmental network between Rennes and Dinard.

Museum 
The Railway Museum was opened in the station in 1991.
It is managed by the Dinan Railway Society, and present the history of the regional railroad and material gathered by collectors association: models, costumes, posters, job referrals, model trains and a beautiful and very large scale model at 1:43 with several trains running in a large Dinan landscape that is rich in details.

See also 

 List of SNCF stations in Brittany

References

Railway stations in Côtes-d'Armor
Railway stations in France opened in 1879
Buildings and structures completed in 1931
Monuments historiques of Côtes-d'Armor